Alain Brichant (born 7 May 1959) is a former professional tennis player from Belgium.

Biography
From 1981 to 1986, Brichant competed for the Belgium Davis Cup team in a total of eight ties and was the second member of his family to represent Belgium in tennis. His father Jacky, a French Open semi-finalist, played in a record 42 Davis Cup ties.
Alain possède 8 titres de champion de Belgique, 1 en simple Messieurs (indoor), 4 en double Messieurs et 3 en double mixte.

Most of Brichant's appearances on the Grand Prix circuit came as a doubles player. His best performance on tour was a semi-final appearance at the Brussels Outdoor in 1980, with Bernard Boileau as his partner. He won two Challenger doubles titles.

He featured in the main draw of the men's doubles at both the 1981 French Open and 1982 French Open.

Challenger titles

Doubles: (2)

See also
List of Belgium Davis Cup team representatives

References

External links
 
 
 

1959 births
Living people
Belgian male tennis players
Place of birth missing (living people)